(Mary) Kathleen Baxter, née Young, (30 May 1901 – 25 October 1988) was an English women's rights activist.

Born in Bradford to a Roman Catholic family, Kathleen Young was educated at St. Joseph's Catholic College, Bradford and the Society of Oxford Home Students, Oxford. She worked as an inspector of taxes until obliged to resign from the Inland Revenue on marriage to a barrister, Herbert James Baxter, in 1931.

In 1951 she joined the National Council of Women, rising to become vice-president in 1961-1964 and president in 1964–1966. In 1968 she wrote a paper on women's rights for the United Nations international conference on human rights. Taking up law later in life, she was called to the bar (Inner Temple) in 1971, although she stopped practice after her husband became seriously ill in 1974.

An active Roman Catholic, Baxter was president of the National Board of Catholic Women from 1974 to 1977, and awarded the papal cross Pro Ecclesia et Pontifice in 1978. She died in Bromley.

References
Diana Grantham Reid, ‘Baxter , (Mary) Kathleen (1901–1988)’, rev., Oxford Dictionary of National Biography, Oxford University Press, 2004, accessed 27 July 2009

1901 births
1988 deaths
English Roman Catholics
British feminists
British women's rights activists
Members of the Inner Temple
People educated at St. Joseph's Catholic College, Bradford
20th-century British lawyers
Presidents of the National Council of Women of Great Britain